Cameron Jarrod Fleming (born September 3, 1992) is an American football offensive tackle for the Denver Broncos of the National Football League (NFL). He was drafted by the New England Patriots in the fourth round of the 2014 NFL Draft. He played college football at Stanford.

High school career
Fleming attended Cypress Creek High School in Houston, Texas. He played football for Cypress Creek.

Considered a three-star recruit by Rivals.com, he was rated as the 38th best offensive tackle prospect of his class.

College career
Fleming attended Stanford University from 2010 to 2013, but was redshirted in his freshman year in 2010. He became a freshman All-American as a redshirt freshman in 2011. He was an all-Pac-12 honorable mention in his sophomore season. As a junior, Fleming made the All-Pac-12 second-team. He decided to forgo his senior season and enter the NFL Draft. He started 39 games at right tackle during his career. He entered the 2014 NFL Draft after his junior season.

Professional career

New England Patriots 
Fleming was drafted in the fourth round of the 2014 NFL Draft by the New England Patriots. Fleming appeared in nine games in the 2014 season including the playoffs and won Super Bowl XLIX with the New England Patriots.

Fleming was a surprise cut by the Patriots at the end of the 2015 preseason but was signed to the Patriots' practice squad. He was promoted to the active roster on October 16, 2015, after starting left tackle Nate Solder was placed on season-ending injured reserve with a torn biceps.

In the 2016 season, Fleming played in all 16 regular-season games with five starts mainly as a reserve tackle and reporting as an extra blocker. He contributed to the Patriots' 14-2 record, which earned them the top-seed for the AFC playoffs.

On February 5, 2017, Fleming was part of the Patriots team that won Super Bowl LI. In the game, the Patriots defeated the Atlanta Falcons by a score of 34–28 in overtime. The Patriots trailed 28–3 in the third quarter, but rallied all the way back to win the game, which featured the first overtime game in Super Bowl history and the largest comeback in the Super Bowl.

On September 24, 2017, Fleming made his first start of the season at left tackle against the Houston Texans. He finished the 2017 season with five consecutive starts to finish the regular season. On January 21, 2018, Fleming started at right tackle in the AFC Championship game, making his first career postseason start. Two weeks later, he started at right tackle in the Super Bowl, where the Patriots lost to the Philadelphia Eagles 41-33.

Dallas Cowboys 
On March 26, 2018, Fleming signed a one-year contract with the Dallas Cowboys worth up to $3.5 million. He played in 14 games, starting three at left tackle in place of an injured Tyron Smith.

On March 13, 2019, Fleming signed a two-year, $7.5 million contract extension with the Cowboys. He played in 14 games, starting three at left tackle in place of an injured Smith. On March 17, 2020, the Cowboys declined the option on Fleming's contract, making him an unrestricted free agent.

New York Giants 

On March 26, 2020, Fleming signed with the New York Giants, reuniting with former Cowboys head coach Jason Garrett and offensive line coach Marc Colombo. He started all 16 games at right tackle in 2020.

Denver Broncos
On May 20, 2021, Fleming signed a one-year, $1.67 million contract with the Denver Broncos. He re-signed with the Denver Broncos on July 27, 2022.

References

External links
Stanford Cardinal bio

1992 births
Living people
Sportspeople from Killeen, Texas
Players of American football from Texas
American football offensive tackles
Stanford Cardinal football players
New England Patriots players
Dallas Cowboys players
New York Giants players
Denver Broncos players